Patrick John Lane (born 18 February 2001) is a professional footballer who plays as a winger for  club Portsmouth.

Club career
Having previously played for Blackburn Rovers at youth level, Lane came through Hyde United's youth academy, and started his senior career at the club. He joined Farsley Celtic of the National League North on a one-month loan in November 2020, and returned to the club on a second month-long loan the following month. He made 9 appearances across his two loan spells at Farsley Celtic. Having scored 13 goals in 67 appearances in all competitions for Hyde United, Lane signed for EFL League One club Fleetwood Town on a two-year deal for an undisclosed fee in summer 2021. He made his debut for the club on 11 September 2021 as a substitute in a 4–2 win away to Rotherham United, and scored his first goal for the club on 25 September when he "cut inside and fired a fine finish into the far corner" to equalise in a 2–2 draw with Cambridge United. He was named in the club's starting line-up for their following match on 28 September – a 1–1 draw with Milton Keynes Dons. In December 2021, he signed a new contract with the club until the summer of 2024, with the option to extend the contract by a year. After two goals and an assist in January 2022, he was nominated for the EFL League One Player of the Month award for that month, but lost to Michael Smith of Rotherham United. Lane ended his first season in professional football by winning the EFL League One Young Player of the Year award. He was also awarded the Fleetwood Town Supporters' Player of the Year Award.

International career
Born in Halifax, West Yorkshire, England, Lane was eligible to play for England, Wales, Republic of Ireland and Northern Ireland through heritage. Lane has represented Northern Ireland six times at under-21 level, scoring once.

Lane was called up to the senior Northern Ireland squad in March 2022. Lane made his senior international debut on 29 March in a 1–0 defeat to Hungary, starting the game in left-wing-back position.

Style of play
Lane plays as a winger.

Career statistics

Club

International

Honours
Individual
EFL League One Young Player of the Year: 2021–22
Fleetwood Town Supporters' Player of the Year: 2021–22

References

External links
Paddy Lane at hydeunited.co.uk
Paddy Lane at Football Web Pages

2001 births
Living people
English footballers
Association footballers from Northern Ireland
Northern Ireland under-21 international footballers
Association football wingers
Blackburn Rovers F.C. players
Hyde United F.C. players
Farsley Celtic F.C. players
Fleetwood Town F.C. players
Northern Premier League players
National League (English football) players
English Football League players
Northern Ireland international footballers